Metapramine (brand names Prodastene, Timaxel) is a tricyclic antidepressant (TCA) developed by Rhone Poulenc that was introduced for the treatment of depression in France in 1984. In addition to its efficacy against affective disorders, it also has analgesic properties, and may be useful in the treatment of pain.

Metapramine has desipramine-like effects, acting as a norepinephrine reuptake inhibitor without affecting the reuptake of serotonin or dopamine. It has also been shown to act as a low-affinity NMDA receptor antagonist. Metapramine's direct effects on serotonin, histamine, and muscarinic acetylcholine receptors have not been assayed, but uniquely among most TCAs, it has anecdotally been reported to lack anticholinergic effects.

References

Dibenzazepines
Tricyclic antidepressants